K. C. Ramamurthy was a member of the Rajya Sabha from the state of Karnataka, India. He is chairman of the CMR Jnanadhara Trust and a former Inspector General of Police in Bangalore, Karnataka. He was also the Registrar of Bangalore University between January 2002-31 October 2003.

Early life 
Ramamurthy is one of twelve children in a large, wealthy and liberal-minded family; their father was Chikka Muniappa Reddy. He is married to Sabitha, with whom he has a daughter and son.

Career 

Ramamurthy was an Inspector General of Police As was quite common among senior police officers in Karnataka, he took retirement to concentrate on politics in December 2007, at which time he was Additional Commissioner of Police (Traffic & Security). In 2013, he was among the parties accused in court of a fraudulent land transaction, with prior allegations that his police colleagues might have tried to cover up the affair. Ramamurthy denied the allegations.

Despite not having much interaction with the Indian National Congress (INC), Ramamurthy was elected in 2016 to serve a two-year term as an INC representative in the Rajya Sabha - the upper house of the Parliament of India - by the Legislative Assembly of Karnataka. He had previously expressed a desire to stand as an INC candidate for election to the Lok Sabha in the 2014 Indian general election and had been wooed by the Janata Dal (Secular) party after the INC chose not to select him.

CMR Jnanadhara Trust 
The CMR Jnanadhara Trust was established in 1994. Ramamurthy is chairman and his wife is president. Its origins lie in the National Junior Public School that was established in 1990 in an orchard that then belonged to the Ramamurthy family. It has expanded to operate a wide range of institutions, ranging from a Montessori school and a junior college, as well as institutes of management studies and of technology. The umbrella organisation now includes CMR Institute of Technology and CMR University.

References 

1952 births
Living people
Indian National Congress politicians from Karnataka
Indian police officers
Rajya Sabha members from Karnataka
Politicians from Bangalore
Karnataka Police